The following is a list of Illinois High School Association member conferences.  Schools that belong to these conferences compete with each other on a local level in athletics and non-athletic activities. As of the 2017-18 school year there are 68 conferences.

Current Conferences
Apollo Conference
Big Northern Conference
Big Twelve Conference
Black Diamond Conference
Cahokia Conference (contains two divisions)
Central Illinois Conference
Central State Eight Conference
Central Suburban League (contains two divisions)
Chicago Catholic League (contains two divisions)
Chicago Prep Conference
Chicago Public High School League (contains ten divisions)
DuPage Valley Conference
East Central Illinois Conference
East Suburban Catholic Conference
Egyptian Illini Conference
Fox Valley Conference
Girls Catholic Athletic Conference
Greater Egyptian Conference
Heart of Illinois Conference
Illini Prairie Conference
Independent School League
Inter County Athletic Conference
Interstate Eight Conference
Kishwaukee River Conference
Lake Shore Athletic Conference
Lincoln Trail Conference
Little Illini Conference
Little Okaw Valley Conference
Little Ten Conference
Lincoln Prairie Conference
Metro Suburban Conference
Metropolitan Prep Conference
Mid-Illini Conference
Midland Trail Conference
Mid-Suburban League (contains two divisions)
Mississippi Valley Conference
MSM Conference
National Trail Conference
Noble Athletic Conference
North Suburban Conference
Northeastern Athletic Conference
Northern Illinois Conference (NIC-10)
Northern Lake County Conference 
Northwest Upstate Illini Conference (contains two divisions)
Pike County Conference
Prairie State Conference
Prairieland Conference
River Valley Conference
Sangamo Conference
South Central Conference (Illinois)
South Egyptian Conference
South Seven Conference
South Suburban Conference
Southern Illinois River-to-River Conference (with Mississippi and Ohio River divisions)
Southland Athletic Conference
Southwest Prairie Conference
Southwest Suburban Conference
Southwestern Conference
Three Rivers Conference
Tomahawk Conference (Illinois)
Tri-County Conference
Upstate Eight Conference
Vermilion Valley Conference
West Central Conference
West Suburban Conference (contains two divisions)
Western Big 6 Conference
Western Illinois Valley Conference (contains two divisions)

Former Conferences
Ambraw Valley Conference (1945-1955)
Big 8 (1980-1995)
Big Rivers Conference (football-only) (1999-2012)
Bi-County Conference (1917-1919)
Bi-County Conference (1970s-1998)
Blackhawk Conference (West) (1934-1990)
Blackhawk Conference (North) (1947-1972)
Bureau Valley Conference (1970s-1990s)
Capitol Conference (1964-1982)
Cenois Conference (1963-1969)
Central Conference (1956-1958)
Central Egyptian Conference (1929-1940)
Chicagoland Prep Conference (1961-1969)
Coal Belt Conference (1946-1956)
Cook County High School League (1889–1913)
Corn Belt Conference (1950–2017)
Des Plaines Valley Conference (1963-1985)
East Okaw Conference (1981-1995)
Eastern Illinois Conference (1952-1969)
Four Rivers Conference (2000-2006)
Fox Valley Conference (1952-1966)
Gateway East Conference (1979-1983)
Greater Midwestern Conference (1983-1986)
Heartland Conference (Illinois) (1978-1982)
Heart of Illinois Conference (1970s) (1972–1978)
Illini Central Conference (1985-1998)
Illini 8 Conference (1966-1981)
Illini Valley Conference (North Central) (1970-1972)
Illini Valley Conference (South Central) (1928-1973)
Illio Conference (1952-1975)
Illowa Conference (1952-1974)
Indian Valley Conference (1976-1994)
Iroquois Conference (1970s-1980s)
Kane County Conference (????-1917)
Kankakee Valley Conference (1950-1979)
La Moine Valley Conference (1952-1967)
Little 6 Conference (1952–1975)
Little 7 Conference (1921–1995)
Little 8 Conference (North Central) (1921–1975)
Little 8 Conference (Far North) (1920s–1980)
Little 8 Conference (Northeast) (1919–19??)
Little 8 Conference (Northwest) (1918–192?)
Little 8 Conference (Southwest) (????–????)
Little Egypt Conference (1960s-1970s)
Little Five Conference (1923-1939)
Little Four Conference (19??'s-1948)
Meridian Conference (Central Illinois) (1959-1993)
Meridian Conference (Northern Illinois) (????-????)
Metro Catholic Conference (1960-1965)
Mid Northern Confernce (1972-1995)
Mid-South Conference (1983-2008)
Mid-State Conference (1944-1997)
Mid-State Six Conference (196?-2015)
Midwest Conference (1948-1970)
Midwestern Conference (1952-1970)
Mississippi Valley Conference (1957-1968)
New Salem Conference
North Central Illinois Conference (1929-2011)
North Egypt Conference (1938-2003)
North Shore Conference (1904-1914)
North Six Conference (1939-1946)
Northern Illinois Big 12 Conference (2010-2018)
Northwest Conference (1963-1974)
Northwest Illinois Conference (NWIC) (1974-1996)
Northwest 7 Conference (1972-1973)
Northwest 8 Conference (1977-1990)
Northwest Suburban Conference (1925-1997)
Okaw Valley Conference (1950s-2017)
Olympic Conference (1976-2010)
PMSC Conference (1961-1973)
Quad Cities Metro Conference (1950-1977)
River Trails Conference (1990-1995)
Rock River (Valley) Conference (1924-1948)
Route 72 Conference (1952-1972)
Sangamon Valley Conference (1948-2021)
SHARK Conference (1946-1982)
SICA — (South Inter-Conference Association, dissolved 2006)
Southeast Suburban Conference (1962-1972)
Southern Illini Conference (1957-1974)
Southern Illini Conference (1986-1993)
Southwest Egyptian Conference (????-1993)
Spoon River Conference (1959-1985)
Stephenson County Conference (1958-1963) (Renamed "Northwest Illinois Conference")
Suburban Catholic Conference (1960-1973)
Suburban Catholic Conference (2009-2015)
Suburban League (1913–1975)
Suburban Prairie Conference (1995-2005)
SWANI Conference (1946-1953)
Tollway Athletic Conference
Trailblazer Conference (1982-1984)
Tri State Conference (1932-1935)
Two Rivers Conference (19??-1958)
United Conference (1958-1963)
Upstate Illini Conference (1974-1976)
Upstate Illini Conference (1991-2000)
US Grant Conference (1950-1958)
Vermilion Valley Conference (1950-1981) 
Wauseca Conference (1928-1989)
West Prairie Trail Conference
Western Area Conference (1974-1996)
Western Athletic Conference (1908-1921)
Western Sun Conference (2006-2010)
Western Suburban Athletic Conference (1903-1910)
Western Suburban Catholic Conference (1974-1988)
Wilco Conference (1959-1973)
Wil-Ro-Kee Conference (1954-1959) (Renamed "Kankakee Valley Conference" in 1960)

External links
Illinois High School Association, Official Site
IHSA Conferences and Leagues

 
High school sports conferences and leagues in the United States